Gonzalo Matias Carou (born 15 August 1979) is an Argentine handball player for Ademar León and the Argentina men's national handball team.

He defended Argentina at the 2012 London Summer Olympics, at 11 World Handball Championships (including the 2021 World Men's Handball Championship in Egypt), which is a sport record..

References

External links

1979 births
Living people
Argentine male handball players
Olympic handball players of Argentina
Handball players at the 2012 Summer Olympics
Handball players at the 2016 Summer Olympics
Handball players at the 2003 Pan American Games
Handball players at the 2007 Pan American Games
Handball players at the 2011 Pan American Games
Handball players at the 2015 Pan American Games
Pan American Games medalists in handball
Pan American Games gold medalists for Argentina
Pan American Games silver medalists for Argentina
Sportspeople from Buenos Aires
Liga ASOBAL players
CB Ademar León players
Expatriate handball players
Argentine expatriate sportspeople in France
Argentine expatriate sportspeople in Spain
South American Games silver medalists for Argentina
South American Games medalists in handball
Competitors at the 2018 South American Games
Medalists at the 2007 Pan American Games
Medalists at the 2015 Pan American Games
Medalists at the 2011 Pan American Games
Handball players at the 2020 Summer Olympics